Georgia's location, nestled between the Black Sea, Russia, and Turkey, renders it strategically important. It is developing as the gateway from the Black Sea to the Caucasus and the larger Caspian region, but also serves as a buffer between Russia and Turkey. Georgia has a long and tumultuous relationship with Russia, but it is reaching out to its other neighbours and looking to the West in search of alternatives and opportunities. It signed a partnership and cooperation agreement with the European Union, participates in the Partnership for Peace, and encourages foreign investment. France, Germany, South Korea, the United Kingdom, and the United States all have embassies in Tbilisi. Georgia in 2004-2008 sought to become a member of NATO, but did not succeed in the face of strong Russian opposition.

Georgia is a member of the United Nations, the Council of Europe, and the OSCE.
Because of its strategic location, Georgia is in both the Russian and American spheres of influence, however Georgia's relationship with Russia is at its lowest point since 1921 due to controversies regarding espionage and the Russo-Georgian War. As a result, Georgia broke off diplomatic relations with Russia and has left the Commonwealth of Independent States.

Diplomatic relations 
Georgia maintains diplomatic relations with 186 UN member states, Holy See and the Sovereign Military Order of Malta. The list below excludes Tanzania as no date is given.

Relations by country

Multilateral

Africa

Americas

Asia

Europe

Oceania

Overview
Georgia has established relations with 185 countries and the Order of Malta. Georgia has terminated its diplomatic relations with Russia, Nicaragua and Syria.

Georgia has not yet established diplomatic relations with:
Venezuela, Nauru
Bhutan, Cook Islands, Niue
Sahrawi Arab Democratic Republic and the rest of states with limited recognition.

See also
Ministry of Foreign Affairs of Georgia
List of diplomatic missions in Georgia
List of diplomatic missions of Georgia
Georgia – European Union relations
 EU Neighbourhood Info Centre: Country profile of Georgia

Further reading
 NATO and the South Caucasus. Analyses, Chronicles, Opinion Polls in the Caucasus Analytical Digest No. 5
 Edilashvili, Maia: "Foreign Direct Investment Declines in Georgia" in the Caucasus Analytical Digest No. 28

Notes

References

External links
MFA of Georgia - Bilateral relations
Ministry of Foreign Affairs of Georgia
The Permanent Mission of Georgia to the United Nations
United Nations Observer Mission in Georgia
Georgia v. Russia Provisional Measures Order and President Rosalyn Higgins concurring and Joint Dissenting Opinion and ASIL

Bilateral relations of Georgia (country)
 
Government of Georgia (country)
Politics of Georgia (country)